Work may refer to: 

 Work (human activity), intentional activity people perform to support themselves, others, or the community
 Manual labour, physical work done by humans
 House work, housework, or homemaking
 Working animal, an animal trained by humans to perform tasks
 Work (physics), the product of force and displacement
 Work (electric field), the work done on a charged particle by an electric field
 Work (thermodynamics), energy transferred by the system to its surroundings
 Creative work, a manifestation of creative effort 
Work of art

Broadcast call signs
 WORK (FM), now WRFK (FM), an American radio station in Vermont
 WORK-LP, an American low-power TV station in New Hampshire
 WOYK, an American AM radio station in Pennsylvania, known as WORK 1932–1973

Music
 The Work (band), an English post-punk rock group
 Work Group, an American record label

Albums and EPs
 Work (EP), a 2015 EP by Marcus Marr and Chet Faker
 Work!, a 1986 album by Mulgrew Miller
 Work 1989–2002, a 2002 album by Orbital
 Work (album), a 2010 album by Shout Out Louds

Songs
 "Work" (ASAP Ferg song) (2012)
 "Work" (Iggy Azalea song) (2013)
 "Work" (Ciara song) (2009)
 "Work" (Jars of Clay song) (2006)
 "Work" (Jimmy Eat World song) (2004)
 "Work" (Rihanna song) (2016)
 "Work" (Kelly Rowland song) (2008)
 "Work" (The Saturdays song) (2008)
 "Work" (The 2 Bears song) (2012)
 "Work", a 1980 song by Bob Marley and the Wailers from Uprising
 "Work", a 2006 song by Mac Boney from Grand Hustle Presents: In da Streetz Volume 4
 "Work", a 1998 song by Gang Starr from Moment of Truth
 "Work", a 2018 song by ionnalee from Everyone Afraid to Be Forgotten
 "Work", a 2013 single by Jme
 "Work", a 2018 song by Little Big Town from Wanderlust
 "Work", a 1990 song by Lou Reed and John Cale from Songs for Drella
 "Work", a 1956 song by Thelonious Monk and Sonny Rollins from Thelonious Monk and Sonny Rollins

Other uses
 Work (film), a 1915 silent film starring Charlie Chaplin
 Work (painting), by Ford Madox Brown
 Work (professional wrestling), a term with several meanings
 Work (vehicle), an electric vehicle by StreetScooter
 Work: A Story of Experience, an 1873 novel by Louisa May Alcott
 Good works or works, a person's actions or deeds in contrast to inner qualities
 Slack Technologies's NYSE symbol
 Work, a 1978 play by Ron Milner

People with the surname
 Delta Work (born 1976), Mexican-American drag queen
 Jimmy Work (1924–2018), American singer-songwriter

 Milton Work (1864–1934), American authority on bridge and whist

See also

 Career, an individual's journey through learning, work and other aspects of life
 Employment, a relationship between two parties where work is paid for
 Karma ('action', 'work' or 'deed'), the spiritual principle of cause and effect
 Labour (disambiguation)
 Wage labour, the socioeconomic relationship between a worker and an employer
 Work ethic, a belief that hard work and diligence have a moral benefit
 Work of art (disambiguation)
 Work Work (disambiguation)
 Working (disambiguation)
 Works (disambiguation)
 The Works (disambiguation)